This annotated list includes
 major present-day Czech-English dictionaries,
 Czech dictionaries, both contemporary and historical.

Czech-English dictionaries
Notable present-day Czech-English dictionaries are:

 Fronek, Josef. Velký česko-anglický slovník = Large Czech-English dictionary. 2nd, enlarged ed., Voznice: Leda, 2013. xlvi, 1743 pp. . A comprehensive dictionary, intended also for English speakers.
 Poldauf, Ivan. Velký česko-anglický slovník = Comprehensive Czech-English dictionary. 3rd ed. Čelákovice: W.D. Publications, 1996. 1187 pp. . A handy-sized dictionary, albeit somewhat out of date.

Czech dictionaries
There are three dictionaries of current Czech that are of use for native speakers:

 Kroupová, Libuše et al. Slovník spisovné češtiny pro školu a veřejnost: s Dodatkem Ministerstva školství, mládeže a tělovýchovy České republiky. (SSČ) 4th ed. Praha: Academia, 2005. 647 pp. . Basic Czech dictionary, contains 45,366 headwords, intended primarily for use in schools and for laymen. Online as part of the Internet Language Reference Book.
 Havránek, Bohuslav, et al. Slovník spisovného jazyka českého. (SSJČ) 2nd ed. Praha: Academia, 1989. 8 vols. A dictionary of first choice when reading the classics, the SSJČ contains a total of 192,908 entries and sub-entries. Online.
 Příruční slovník jazyka českého. (PSJČ) V Praze: Státní nakladatelství, 1935-1957. 9 vols. The PSJČ is largely outdated, though it may be of use thanks to the wealth of information (ca 250,000 entries) and meticulous definitions. Online.

See also
 Lists of dictionaries

External links
 Wikiversity:Czech dictionaries

Czech
Lists of reference books
Dictionaries, List of